Michelle Buteau (born July 24, 1977) is an American stand-up comedian, actress, television host, and podcast host.

Early life
Buteau was born in New Jersey to a Haitian father of partial Lebanese descent and a Jamaican mother of half-French descent. She attended college at Florida International University and was considering a career in journalism before moving into comedy.

Career
Buteau started performing comedy a few days after September 11, 2001. After five years as a stand-up comedian, Buteau landed her first television spot on Comedy Central.

In 2017, Buteau was listed as one of ten comedians to watch by Esquire.

In 2018, Buteau started hosting the Late Night Whenever! podcast, which was labeled as "one of the best podcasts of 2018 so far" by Time.  Buteau was also part of The Comedy Lineup on Netflix where up and coming comedians have 15 minute stand-up sets.

In 2019, Buteau appeared in the movies: Someone Great, Isn't It Romantic, Sell By, and Always Be My Maybe. She also began hosting the WNYC podcast, Adulting, with co-host Jordan Carlos. That same year, Buteau appeared in two television series: First Wives Club and Tales of the City. In 2020, Buteau started hosting The Circle, a reality TV show on Netflix.

In 2020, Buteau published her first book, a collection of personal essays titled Survival of the Thickest, with Gallery Books, an imprint of Simon & Schuster.

Buteau's Michelle Buteau: Welcome to Buteaupia won a 2021 Critics' Choice Television Award for Best Comedy Special.

In June 2022, it was announced that Buteau is set to take part in a movie directed by Pamela Adlon. Buteau will play the role of Dawn, the film's main character's best friend.

Personal life 
Buteau married Dutch photographer Gijs van der Most in 2010. Buteau and van der Most have twins, Hazel and Otis van der Most, who were born in January 2019 via surrogacy.

She is Catholic.

Filmography

References

External links

 
 

American television actresses
Living people
Actresses from New Jersey
American people of Haitian descent
American actors of Jamaican descent
American people of Lebanese descent
American people of French descent
American women comedians
American film actresses
American women podcasters
American podcasters
21st-century American comedians
American stand-up comedians
Comedians from New Jersey
21st-century American actresses
1977 births
African-American Catholics
Catholics from New Jersey